Tommaso Costantino (23 June 1885 – 28 February 1950) was an Italian fencer. He won two gold medals at the 1920 Summer Olympics.

References

1885 births
1950 deaths
Italian male fencers
Olympic fencers of Italy
Fencers at the 1920 Summer Olympics
Olympic gold medalists for Italy
Olympic medalists in fencing
Sportspeople from Tunis
Medalists at the 1920 Summer Olympics
20th-century Italian people